Warren Anderson Mathis (born March 6, 1977), better known by his stage name Bubba Sparxxx, is an American rapper. His singles include "Deliverance", "Ugly" (both featuring Timbaland), and "Ms. New Booty" (featuring Ying Yang Twins and Mr. Collipark), the latter of which peaked at number 7 on the U.S. Billboard Hot 100.

Early life 
Mathis grew up in a rural area near LaGrange, Georgia. He is of French descent. His father was a school bus driver, and his mother was a grocery store cashier. His closest neighbor, who lived half a mile away, introduced him to rap music through mixtapes mailed from New York City. The music of 2 Live Crew was his introduction to hip hop; he began listening to West Coast gangsta rap such as N.W.A and Too Short and the Atlanta duo Outkast. With rapping as a hobby, he was a tight end and linebacker for his high school's football team and earned All-Region honors in his senior year. Steve Herndon, a former offensive lineman for the NFL's Atlanta Falcons and Denver Broncos, played football with him during high school, according to an interview with Down-South.com. In 2007, he moved to Tampa, Florida.

Career 

In 1996, he moved to Athens, Georgia, where he met industry veteran Bobby Stamps. Stamps noticed him rapping after a University of Georgia football game and later introduced him to Atlanta producer Shannon Houchins.

For two years, Houchins and Stamps worked together to produce Sparxxx's first commercial release, Dark Days, Bright Nights, which released in 2001. The debut album saw some success in Georgia and caught the attention of Jimmy Iovine of Interscope Records. Sparxxx signed to Interscope and began working with record producers Timbaland, Organized Noize as well as continuing to work with Shannon Houchins. The major-label reissue of Dark Days, Bright Nights, released via Timbaland's Beat Club Records imprint and which now included five collaborations with Timbaland and two with Organized Noise, debuted at #3 on the Billboard 200.

In 2002, he had a minor hit being featured on Archie Eversole's "We Ready", which became popular for being played at sporting events, such as American Football and basketball games. In late 2003, he returned with his second album, Deliverance, which was critically acclaimed but sold poorly.

Sparxxx signed a recording contract with Virgin Records in 2004; under Virgin, Sparxxx released The Charm with singles "Ms. New Booty" and "Heat It Up".

He left Virgin to establish his own label, New South Entertainment, which is distributed by E1 Records. In 2007, he released a mixtape with DJ Burn One titled Survive Till Ya Thrive.

In 2012, he signed to Backroad Records, a subsidiary of the independent label Average Joes Entertainment owned by Shannon Houchins and Colt Ford, and recorded the song "Country Boy Coolin'" which was featured on Mud Digger Vol. 3, a compilation album released by Average Joe's on June 12, 2012. He stated in an interview that he planned on releasing an album to be called Miracle on Gamble Road, in 2012.

In January 2013, Sparxxx released the video "Splinter" which featured Crucifix. In July 2013, a video for his single "Country Folks", which features Danny Boone of the band Rehab and Colt Ford and produced by Houchins, was released. The album Pain Management was released on October 15, 2013.

In March 2016, Sparxxx signed to Yelawolf's Slumerican records imprint. On October 7, 2016, Sparxxx released his first release under Slumerican The Bubba Mathis EP. Sparxxx released Rapper From The Country on September 16, 2018, through New South Entertainment (E1).

On November 11, 2020, Sparxxx released an EP, Crickets with Hosier. On December 4, 2020, Sparxxx released his seventh album King of Crap through New South Entertainment. which had the single "Bird Dawg". In May 2021, WORLDSTARHIPHOP released a video for "Bird Dawg".

Discography

Studio albums

Mixtapes

EPs 
 The Bubba Mathis EP (2015)
 Crap Gawd (2021)

Collaborative EPs 

 Crickets (with Hosier) (2020)
 Life Is Serious (with Los Ghost) (2021)

Singles

Guest singles

Guest appearances

Video game appearances 
Bubba Sparxxx is a playable character in the video game Def Jam: Fight for NY.

References

External links 
Bubba Sparxxx on Myspace

1977 births
Living people
American country singer-songwriters
Dungeon Family members
Interscope Records artists
People from LaGrange, Georgia
American people of French descent
Musicians from Tampa, Florida
Rappers from Atlanta
Rappers from Florida
Swing Mob artists
Virgin Records artists
Rappers from Georgia (U.S. state)
Country rap musicians
Southern hip hop musicians
American male rappers
MNRK Music Group artists
Universal Records artists
EMI Records artists
21st-century American rappers
Purple Ribbon All-Stars members
Singer-songwriters from Florida
Singer-songwriters from Georgia (U.S. state)